is a 1965 Japanese action comedy film directed by Jun Fukuda. A parody of James Bond-style spy movies, the film stars Akira Takarada, Mie Hama, and Ichirō Arishima. In the film, an ordinary vacationer is assigned to a dead Interpol agent's mission and caught between rival gangs that are squabbling over a shipment of arms.

Plot 

Two Japanese on a jet plane leaving the airport in Paris. One is a second generation born in England. One is a reticent man. The two traveled with Bancock and Hong Kong without revealing their surnames, but the second-generation youth was killed by a hitman in Hong Kong. The passport left behind was marked as the International Secret Police Andrew Hoshino. The reticent man named Andrew Hoshino and arrived at Haneda with his passport. A strange incident happened at the crowded airport. A stripper's makeup bag exploded at customs. Then, a Chinese escaped in the turmoil as if he was aiming for an opportunity. Youth Hoshino tracked down, but finally lost sight of him. Yumi, a beautiful woman who approaches Hoshino by car, is a fashionable hitman who sells plastic explosives in Southeast Asia. Guided by Yumi, I arrived at the basement of the killer's nest "Akatsuki-gumi". The Chinese, Huang Chang-age, has smuggled 100 CRS pistols from Hong Kong with a stripper in order to annihilate Aonuma Kogyo, which is competing with the Akatsuki group. But Yumi had a more powerful weapon. A plastic explosive that can explode anytime, anywhere with an ultrasonic whistle. Eventually, Paris reported that a detective from the International Secret Police had been dispatched, and Tezuka, a detective from the Metropolitan Police Department, sneaked into the Akatsuki group. However, Tezuka was also trapped in the basement. Akatsuki-gumi, who was troubled by the end of the two, moved them to a freezing truck and headed for the Tokai region with Yumi as a watchman. However, Tezuka flirts with the hot exchange between Hoshino and Yumi. On the other hand, Huang, who is hungry, sold 100 guns to the Akatsuki group and went to Aonuma Kogyo, and sold 200 guns to the Aonuma group in exchange for the secret of the Akatsuki group. In addition, Huang was told by Aonuma that Hoshino was a hitman dispatched from the Swiss trafficking king de Balmeyer and came to Japan aiming for the Frenchman Lebois and Huang, who became independent of the trafficking king in Hong Kong. .. However, Huang was relieved to know that Hoshino was captured by the Akatsuki group. Huang then informed when and where the Akatsuki group would unload 100 guns. However, at that time, Hoshino was running away with Tezuka. Yumi, who saw that 100 cancers were unlikely, fell in love with detective Hoshino, and the two of them fell in love with him. I was able to save. Hoshino and Tezuka then began to search for Huang and Lubois. Tezuka, Hoshino, and Yumi searched for Lubois, who had undergone plastic surgery in Italy, but suddenly learned of a stripper left behind by the manager, and Hoshino and Tezuka Kan were the same person as Lubois. I sensed that there was. Tezuka and his colleagues, who migrated to the CRS Special Investigation Headquarters, flew to Manila and started an investigation with the cooperation of the Manila City Police. Hoshino was captured by Komori, a subordinate of Aonuma, who came from Tokyo, and was put on a Cessna plane driven by Huang Chang-age. Tezuka and Yumi immediately chased by plane, but Huang Chang-age descended with a parachute alone when Hoshino was placed. Hoshino, Tezuka, and Yumi, who crashed into the jungle area, were surrounded by Filipinos, whites under Lubois, and taken to Lubois's weapons factory. Lebois, who first appeared in front of the three, said that a young man named Andrew Hoshino should have killed Huang in Hong Kong, and was suspicious of the fake Hoshino. He was imprisoned in the room by Lubois, who tried to torture Hoshino, but was saved by Yumi's secret weapon. On the contrary, Hoshino, who pushed his pistol against Lebois, contacted the Manila City Police, and Levois, the CRS revolver smuggler, finally closed his eyes. Tezuka, who remained behind, learned that Hoshino was a killer rather than an international secret police, but broke up with regret. Yumi chased after Hoshino. He was taken to the weapons factory in Lebois. Lebois, who first appeared in front of the three, said that a young man named Andrew Hoshino should have killed Huang in Hong Kong, and was suspicious of the fake Hoshino. He was imprisoned in the room by Lubois, who tried to torture Hoshino, but was saved by Yumi's secret weapon. On the contrary, Hoshino, who pushed his pistol against Lebois, contacted the Manila City Police, and Levois, the CRS revolver smuggler, finally closed his eyes. Tezuka, who remained behind, learned that Hoshino was a killer rather than an international secret police, but broke up with regret. Yumi chased after Hoshino. He was taken to the weapons factory in Lebois. Lebois, who first appeared in front of the three, said that a young man named Andrew Hoshino should have killed Huang in Hong Kong, and was suspicious of the fake Hoshino. He was imprisoned in the room by Lubois, who tried to torture Hoshino, but was saved by Yumi's secret weapon. On the contrary, Hoshino, who pushed his pistol against Lebois, contacted the Manila City Police, and Levois, the CRS revolver smuggler, finally closed his eyes. Tezuka, who remained behind, learned that Hoshino was a killer rather than an international secret police, but broke up with regret. Yumi chased after Hoshino.

Cast 
Source:

Release 
It was released in France on November 9, 1966 under the title Spy Hunters.

References

External links 

 
 

1960s Japanese-language films
1965 films
1965 crime films
1965 comedy films
Films directed by Jun Fukuda
Toho films
Films produced by Tomoyuki Tanaka
1960s Japanese films